Duce is an Italian title.

Duce may also refer to:

 Benito Mussolini (1883–1945), Fascist Prime Minister of Italy during World War II, known as Il Duce ("the leader")
 Duce Staley (born 1975), American former National Football League running back
 Adam Duce (born 1972), American heavy metal bass guitarist
 Robert Duce (born 1935), American chemist and professor
 Sharon Duce (born 1954), British actress
 Eldon Hoke (1958–1997), American drummer and singer nicknamed "El Duce"
 Duće, Croatia, a village
 Dar es Salaam University College of Education, Tanzania

See also
 Deuce (disambiguation)
 Dulcie